This article contains information about the literary events and publications of 1984.

Events
April 4 – The narrative of George Orwell's dystopian novel Nineteen Eighty-Four (1949) begins and causes widespread discussion. G. K. Chesterton's The Napoleon of Notting Hill (1904) is also set in this year; and Haruki Murakami's 1Q84 (いちきゅうはちよん, Ichi-Kyū-Hachi-Yon, 2009–2010) is set in a parallel version of it.
June 16 – Cirque du Soleil is founded in Baie-Saint-Paul, Quebec, by two former street performers, Guy Laliberté and Gilles Ste-Croix.
July – Tom Wolfe's novel The Bonfire of the Vanities begins serialization in Rolling Stone.
December 19 – Ted Hughes' appointment as Poet Laureate of the United Kingdom is announced in succession to Sir John Betjeman, Philip Larkin having turned down the post.
unknown dates
Prvoslav Vujčić's second poetry collection, Kastriranje vetra (Castration of the Wind), written during a week's imprisonment in Tuzla for criticising the state, is banned in Yugoslavia.
Of Mice and Men, the 1937 novel by John Steinbeck, is removed from Tennessee public schools, when the School Board Chair promises to oust all "ostensibly filthy" books from public school curricula and libraries.
Redu in Belgium becomes a book town.
Saqi Books, an independent U.K. publisher, is founded by Mai Ghoussoub.

New books

Fiction
Warren Adler – Random Hearts
Kingsley Amis – Stanley and the Women
Martin Amis – Money
V. C. Andrews – Seeds of Yesterday
Jeffrey Archer – First Among Equals
Richard Bachman (Stephen King) – Thinner
J. G. Ballard – Empire of the Sun
Iain Banks – The Wasp Factory
René Barjavel – L'Enchanteur
Julian Barnes – Flaubert's Parrot
J. J. Benítez – Caballo de Troya
Thomas Bernhard – Woodcutters (Holzfällen)
J. Bernlef – Hersenschimmen (Out of Mind)
Michael Bishop
One Winter in Eden
Who Made Stevie Crye?
Simon Brett – A Shock to the System
David Brin – The Practice Effect
Anita Brookner – Hotel du Lac
Tom Clancy – The Hunt for Red October
Maryse Condé – Segou: les murailles de terre
Bernard & Judy Cornwell (as Susannah Kells) – Fallen Angels
Michel Déon – Je vous écris d'Italie
Marguerite Duras – L'Amant
Louise Erdrich – Love Medicine
Howard Fast – The Outsider
Leon Forrest – Two Wings to Veil My Face
Frederick Forsyth – The Fourth Protocol
John Gardner – Role of Honour
William Gibson – Neuromancer
William Golding – "The Paper Men"
Alasdair Gray – 1982, Janine
Kent Haruf – The Tie That Binds
Frank Herbert – Heretics of Dune
David Hughes – The Pork Butcher
John Jakes – Love and War
Stephen King, Peter Straub – The Talisman
Russell Kirk – Watchers at the Strait Gate
Jaan Kross – Professor Martens' Departure (Professor Martensi ärasõit)
Milan Kundera – The Unbearable Lightness of Being (first published in French as L'Insoutenable légèreté de l'être)
Sue Limb – Up the Garden Path
Robert Ludlum – The Aquitaine Progression
Norman Mailer – Tough Guys Don't Dance
Ruth Manning-Sanders – A Book of Magic Horses
Gladys Mitchell – The Crozier Pharaohs
M. T. Vasudevan Nair – Randamoozham (രണ്ടാമൂഴം, Second Turn)
Mitiarjuk Nappaaluk – Sanaaq
Robert B. Parker – Valediction
Milorad Pavić – Dictionary of the Khazars
Ellis Peters
Dead Man's Ransom
The Pilgrim of Hate
Mario Puzo – The Sicilian
Thomas Pynchon – Slow Learner: Early Stories
Christoph Ransmayr – The Terrors of Ice and Darkness
Pratibha Ray – Yajnaseni
Bob Shea and Robert Anton Wilson – The Illuminatus! Trilogy (collected edition)
Michael Slade – Headhunter
Danielle Steel – Full Circle
Neal Stephenson – The Big U (debut novel)
Botho Strauß – The Young Man
Robert Swindells – Brother in the Land
Antonio Tabucchi – Indian Nocturne (Notturno indiano, novella)
John Updike – The Witches of Eastwick
Gore Vidal – Lincoln
Tim Winton – Shallows
Janusz Zajdel – Paradyzja

Children and young people
Chris Van Allsburg – The Mysteries of Harris Burdick
Sandra Cisneros - The House on Mango Street
Helen Cresswell – The Secret World of Polly Flint
Kevin Eastman and Peter Laird – Teenage Mutant Ninja Turtles (comic book)
Mem Fox – Wilfrid Gordon McDonald Partridge
Patricia Reilly Giff – The Beast in Ms. Rooney's Room (first in Polk Street School series)
Michelle Magorian – Back Home
Bill Peet – Pamela Camel
Dr. Seuss – The Butter Battle Book
J. R. R. Tolkien (with Michael Hague) – The Hobbit

Drama
Howard Barker – Scenes from an Execution
Howard Brenton – Bloody Poetry
Dario Fo – Elizabeth: Almost by Chance a Woman (Quasi per caso una donna: Elisabetta)
Michael Frayn – Benefactors
Beth Henley – The Miss Firecracker Contest
Elfriede Jelinek – Illness or Modern Women (Krankheit oder Moderne Frauen, published)
Joshua Sobol – Ghetto
Tom Stoppard – Rough Crossing

Poetry
John Ashbery – A Wave
Louise Erdrich – Jacklight
Christopher Gilbert – Across the Mutual Landscape
Paulette Jiles – Celestial Navigation
Sharon Olds – The Dead and the Living

Non-fiction
Church in Wales – Book of Common Prayer for use in the Church in Wales
Morrill Cody and Hugh Ford – The Women of Montparnasse, the Americans in Paris
Roald Dahl – Boy an autobiography
Louise Hay – You Can Heal Your Life
Lee Iacocca – Iacocca: An Autobiography
Steven Levy – Hackers: Heroes of the Computer Revolution
Audre Lorde – Sister Outsider: Essays and Speeches
Robin Morgan (ed.) – Sisterhood Is Global
M. Alice Ottoboni – The Dose Makes the Poison: A Plain-Language Guide to Toxicology
Derek Parfit – Reasons and Persons
Joan Peters – From Time Immemorial: The Origins of the Arab-Jewish Conflict over Palestine
Herbert Jay Stern – Judgment in Berlin
E. O. Wilson – Biophilia: The Human Bond with Other Species
Charles Berlitz – Atlantis: The Eighth Continent

Births
February 19 - Marissa Meyer, American science-fiction author
April 16 – Amelia Atwater-Rhodes, American novelist
May 9 – Ezra Klein, American journalist and columnist
May 21 – Jackson Pearce, American young-adult novelist
June 5 – Simon Rich, American humorist, novelist and screenwriter
July 11 - Marie Lu, American young-adult novelist
July 12 – Amanda Hocking, American fantasy novelist
August 8 – Owen Jones, English columnist and author and commentator
October 13 - Lauren DeStefano, American young-adult author
November 20 – Halley Feiffer, American playwright and actress
December 10 – Helen Oyeyemi, English novelist and playwright

Deaths
February 12 – Julio Cortázar, Argentine novelist, short story writer and essayist (born 1914)
February 21 – Michail Aleksandrovich Sholokhov, Russian writer, Nobel Prize laureate (born 1905)
February 22
Uwe Johnson, German writer in England (born 1934)
Jessamyn West, American novelist (born 1902)
March 4 – Odd Bang-Hansen, Norwegian novelist and children's writer (born 1908)
March 8 – Eleanor Graham, English children's writer and editor (born 1896)
March 12 – Arnold Ridley, English playwright and actor (born 1896)
March 26 – Branko Ćopić, Bosnian Serb writer (suicide, born 1915)
April 1 – Elizabeth Goudge, English writer (born 1900)
April 15 – Alexander Trocchi, Scottish writer (born 1925)
April 21
Marcel Janco, Romanian–Israeli artist, art theorist, essayist and poet (born 1895)
Manuel Mujica Láinez, Argentine novelist (born 1910)
May 16 – Irwin Shaw, American playwright, screenwriter and novelist (born 1913)
May 19 – John Betjeman, English poet laureate (born 1906)
June 6 – A. Bertram Chandler, English-Australian soldier and author (born 1912))
June 10 – Halide Nusret Zorlutuna, Turkish poet and novelist (born 1901)
June 30 – Lillian Hellman, American playwright (born 1905)
July 6 – Denys Val Baker, Welsh novelist and short story writer (born 1917)
August 14 – J. B. Priestley, English novelist and playwright (born 1894)
August 25 – Truman Capote (Truman Streckfus Persons), American fiction writer (born 1924)
September 7 – Liam O'Flaherty, Irish novelist and short story writer (born 1896)
October 31 – Eduardo De Filippo, Italian playwright (born 1900)
November 6 – Gastón Suárez, Bolivian novelist and dramatist (born 1929)
November 10 – Xavier Herbert, Australian novelist (born 1901)
November 12 – Chester Himes, American writer (born 1909)
December 4 – Ștefan Voitec, Romanian politician and journalist (born 1900)
December 6 – Gray Barker, American writer on paranormal (born 1925)
December 14 – Vicente Aleixandre, Spanish writer, Nobel Prize laureate (born 1898)

Awards
Nobel Prize in Literature: Jaroslav Seifert

Australia
The Australian/Vogel Literary Award: Kate Grenville, Lilian's Story
Kenneth Slessor Prize for Poetry: Les Murray, The People's Other World
Miles Franklin Award: Tim Winton, Shallows

Canada
See 1984 Governor General's Awards for a complete list of winners and finalists for those awards.

France
Prix Goncourt: Marguerite Duras, L'Amant
Prix Médicis French: Bernard-Henri Lévy, Le Diable en tête
Prix Médicis International: Elsa Morante, Aracoeli

Spain
Miguel de Cervantes Prize: Ernesto Sabato

United Kingdom
Betty Trask Award, established by Society of Authors, Prize: Ronald Frame, Winter Journey, Clare Nonhebel, Cold Showers
Booker Prize: Anita Brookner, Hotel du Lac
Carnegie Medal for children's literature: Margaret Mahy, The Changeover
Cholmondeley Award: Michael Baldwin, Michael Hofmann, Carol Rumens
Eric Gregory Award: Martyn Crucefix, Mick Imlah, Jamie McKendrick, Bill Smith, Carol Ann Duffy, Christopher Meredith, Peter Armstrong, Iain Bamforth
James Tait Black Memorial Prize for fiction: J. G. Ballard, Empire of the Sun, and Angela Carter, Nights at the Circus
James Tait Black Memorial Prize for biography: Lyndall Gordon, Virginia Woolf: A Writer's Life
Whitbread Best Book Award: James Buchan, A Parish of Rich Women

United States
Agnes Lynch Starrett Poetry Prize: Arthur Smith, Elegy on Independence Day
Frost Medal: Jack Stadler
Nebula Award: William Gibson, Neuromancer
Newbery Medal for children's literature: Beverly Cleary, Dear Mr. Henshaw
Pulitzer Prize for Drama: David Mamet, Glengarry Glen Ross
Pulitzer Prize for Fiction: William J. Kennedy – Ironweed
Pulitzer Prize for Poetry: Mary Oliver: American Primitive

Elsewhere
Premio Nadal: José de Tomás García – La otra orilla de la droga

References

 
Years of the 20th century in literature